Podgaj may refer to the following places:

Bosnia and Herzegovina
Podgaj, Srebrenica, a village in the municipality of Srebrenica
Podgaj, Tomislavgrad, a village in the municipality of Tomislavgrad

Poland
Podgaj, Lower Silesian Voivodeship (south-west Poland)
Podgaj, Aleksandrów County in Kuyavian-Pomeranian Voivodeship (north-central Poland)
Podgaj, Inowrocław County in Kuyavian-Pomeranian Voivodeship (north-central Poland)
Podgaj, Łódź Voivodeship (central Poland)
Podgaj, Lublin Voivodeship (east Poland)
Podgaj, Greater Poland Voivodeship (west-central Poland)

Slovenia
Podgaj, Šentjur, a settlement in the Municipality of Šentjur

See also
Podkraj (disambiguation)
Potkraj (disambiguation)